The 2001–02 Bulgarian Cup was the 62nd season of the Bulgarian Cup. Levski Sofia won the competition, beating CSKA Sofia 3–1 in the final at the Stadion Slavia in Sofia.

First round
In this round entered winners from the preliminary rounds together with the teams of B Group.

Second round
In this round entered winners from the First Round together with the teams of A Group.

Third round

Quarter-finals

First legs

Second legs

Semi-finals

First legs

Second legs

Final

The final match of the 2001–02 edition of the Bulgarian Cup was held on 15 May 2002 at the Stadion Slavia in Sofia. Levski Sofia beat CSKA Sofia 3–1.

Details

Top scorers

References

2001-02
2001–02 domestic association football cups
Cup